Dunkery Beacon at the summit of Dunkery Hill is the highest point on Exmoor and in Somerset, England. It is also the highest point in southern England outside of Dartmoor.

The site has been visited by humans since the Bronze Age, and contains several burial mounds in the form of cairns and bowl barrows. Sweetworthy on the lower slopes is the site of two Iron Age hill forts or enclosures and a deserted medieval settlement. The hill is part of a Site of Special Scientific Interest and National nature reserve. It was in private ownership until the 20th century, when it was donated to the National Trust by Sir Thomas Acland, Colonel Wiggin and Allan Hughes; a stone cairn was erected at the summit to commemorate the event.

Location

Dunkery is composed of Middle Devonian sedimentary rock, known as the Hangman Sandstone Formation. This supports acidic soils.

At  ordnance datum (OD), the mean height above sea level, Dunkery Beacon is the highest natural point in Somerset, although the tip of the Mendip TV Mast is higher at  OD. John Fry, a character in R. D. Blackmore's 1869 novel Lorna Doone, calls it the "haighest place of Hexmoor".

Dunkery lies just  from the Bristol Channel at Porlock.

History
Dunkery Hill was part of the "Royal Forest of Exmoor", established by Henry II according to the late 13th-century Hundred Rolls. There has been some debate about the origin of the name "Dunkery" and its predecessors "Duncrey" and "Dunnecray". Eilert Ekwall suggests that it comes from the Welsh din meaning hillfort and creic or creag meaning rock.

There are several Bronze Age burial mounds at or near the summit. Two of the largest are Joaney How and Robin How, which have been damaged over many years, although plans have been made to restore and protect them. "How" comes from the Norse for burial mound. In addition to the cairns are barrows, which also date from the Bronze Age.

Sweetworthy, on Dunkery Hill's north-facing slope, is the site of two Iron Age hillforts or enclosures; one has a single rampart and external ditch, enclosing . The rampart is still visible, and the ditch on the east side is used as a trackway. There was a defended settlement above the main site. It is also the site of a deserted medieval settlement, which has been designated a scheduled monument. It has been added to the Heritage at Risk Register because of the vulnerability to plant growth.

In 1918 Sir Thomas Acland granted to the National Trust a 500-year lease of a large part of the Holnicote Estate, including Dunkery Hill. Dunkery Hill was put up for sale in 1928. Labour Party activist and Member of Parliament Margaret Bondfield asked in the House of Commons if the government was willing to have it designated an ancient monument, to preserve it for future generations. She received the reply that although the government was agreeable to having the hill listed there were no funds available for its purchase; the beacon and surrounding mounds were subsequently designated an ancient monument. A further  of nearby land was donated in 1934 by Mrs Hughes in memory of her husband Alan Hughes of Lynch Allerford, Minehead. The donations were commemorated in 1935 with an event when a plaque was attached to the summit memorial cairn. Further parts of the Holnicote Estate, which includes other land donated by the Acland family and others, was given in subsequent years.

Ecology
The site is part of the North Exmoor Site of Special Scientific Interest (SSSI), part of the Dunkery & Horner Woods National Nature Reserve and part of the Exmoor Coastal Heaths Special Area of Conservation.

The hill is blanketed in heather, which gives it a deep purple colour during the summer. Ling and bell heather, gorse, sessile oak, ash, rowan, hazel, bracken, mosses, liverworts, lichens and ferns all grow on the hill or in surrounding woodland, as well as some unique whitebeam species. Exmoor ponies, red deer, pied flycatchers, wood warblers, lesser spotted woodpeckers, redstarts, dippers, snipe, skylarks and kestrels are some of the fauna to be found on or around the hill and in nearby Horner Woods, home to 14 of the 16 UK bat species and including barbastelle and Bechstein's bats.

References

External links

Hills of Somerset
Scheduled monuments in West Somerset
Structures on the Heritage at Risk register in Somerset
National nature reserves in Somerset
Exmoor
Marilyns of England
Highest points of English counties
National Trust properties in Somerset
Bronze Age sites in Somerset